Sinap Castle is a medieval Armenian fortification in Çamlıyayla ilçe (district) of Mersin Province in southern Turkey.

Geography
It is situated to the northeast of Çamlıyayla and to the north of Mersin. The  stabilized road to the castle diverges from the Mersin-Çamlıyayla highway. But it is not particularly high with respect to immediate surroundings.

History
The castle functioned as both a fortified estate house and a guardian along the strategic route between the Het‛umid castle at Lampron (Namrun Kalesi) and the Cilician Gates.  It was one of the many dozens of fortifications within the medieval Armenian Kingdom of Cilicia.  The fort of Sinap is located approximately six kilometers northeast of Lampron on the gentle slope of a partially forested agricultural valley.  The name Sinap means "corner" in old Turkish.

Building
This three-story high structure has a simple rectangular plan with solid cylindrical towers an each corner.  It was built between the 12th and 14th centuries with the typical rusticated ashlar masonry of the Armenians.  The lower floor, which is covered by a partially collapsed pointed vault, has no openings except for one door in the west wall.  A now missing staircase once led to the second level which also has a partially preserved vault.  Its walls are opened by nine beautifully designed casemates with embrasured loopholes, two windows, and an apse (?) in the east wall.  The third level, which undoubtedly had fighting platforms (perhaps with merlons), is destroyed. The fortification was surveyed in 1979.

References

Çamlıyayla District
Castles in Turkey
Castles in Mersin Province
Archaeological sites in Mersin Province, Turkey
History of Mersin Province